Guéret (Occitan: Garait) is a commune and the prefecture of the Creuse department in the Nouvelle-Aquitaine region in central France.

Geography
Guéret is a light industrial town, the largest in the department, with a big woodland and some farming not far from the town centre.

History
Guéret grew up round an abbey founded in the 7th century. In later times it became the capital of the County of La Marche.

Population

Sights
The church of St. Pierre and St. Paul, dating from the thirteenth century.
The Hotel de Moneyroux (incorrectly called "Castle of the Counts of Marche", as no count ever lived in Guéret). This building, of Gothic style, was constructed in the fifteenth century by Antoine Allard (1839-1896). It is now the headquarters of the General Council of the Creuse. It can be visited during public holidays.
The Presidial, dating from the seventeenth century. This building houses the town hall.
The Museum of the Sénatorerie. Partly built in eighteenth century, the building served as the residence of senators under Napoleon. Since 1832, the Society of Archaeological and Natural Sciences of the Creuse, one of the oldest learned societies of France has been housed here. It brings together natural history collections and works of art. In 1907, the Hotel de la Sénatorerie museum was surrounded by a park and trees.
The war memorial.
The seventeenth-century chateau of Sainte Feyrer, built on the foundations of a castle from the Middle Ages, of which there are some remains. The building of the eighteenth century was constructed by the architect Brousseau. It has an elegant staircase and the oratory is classified as an historical monument.
Courtille lake, a recreation area south of Guéret, is an artificial lake along a shaded path. With a circumference of about 3 km, it is used for sports and leisure (running, sailing, walking) or picnicking on the grass
Chabrières forest is large and stretches south of Guéret. It includes:  A zoo, where one can see wolves in semi-liberty in large enclosures. Opened in 2001, it is a noted site in the field of protection of this species. There are some huge natural monoliths, such as "la Pierre Grole" linked to local myths and legends and some old granite quarries, once used mainly for cobblestones of the streets of Paris.

Climate 
Guéret has an oceanic climate (Köppen Cfb) influenced by its elevation and proximity to the Bay of Biscay's maritime inflow of Gulf Stream air. As a result, the climate is mild for its latitude, wet and also relatively gloomy.

Personalities 

 Antoine Varillas, an historian, was born here in 1624.
 Marcel Jouhandeau (1888–1979), writer, was born here.
 Madeleine Chapelle (1782–1849), the wife and model of painter Dominique Ingres.
 Georges Pludermacher (born 1944), classical pianist
 Pierre Michon (born 1945), writer, spent his childhood here.

International relations
Guéret is twinned with:
 Stein, Bavaria, Germany since 1991 and Puck, Poland

See also
Communes of the Creuse department
Monts de Gueret Animal Park

References

External links

Official town website 

Communes of Creuse
Prefectures in France
County of La Marche